Charles Hardinge, 1st Baron Hardinge of Penshurst,  (20 June 1858 – 2 August 1944) was a British diplomat and statesman who served as Viceroy and Governor-General of India from 1910 to 1916.

Background and education

Hardinge was the second son of Charles Hardinge, 2nd Viscount Hardinge, and the grandson of Henry Hardinge, 1st Viscount Hardinge, a former Governor-General of India. He was educated Cheam School, Harrow School and at Trinity College, Cambridge.

Career

Hardinge entered the diplomatic service in 1880. He was appointed the first secretary at Tehran in 1896, and the first secretary at Saint Petersburg in 1898, when he was promoted over the heads of seventeen of his seniors. While in Russia, he acted as chargé d'affaires in the ambassador's absence (including in late 1902). After a brief tenure as Assistant Under-Secretary for Foreign Affairs, he became Ambassador to Russia, in 1904. In 1906, he was promoted to the position of Permanent Under-Secretary at the Foreign Office, where despite his own conservatism, he worked closely with Liberal Foreign Secretary Sir Edward Grey. In 1907, he declined the post of Ambassador to the United States. In 1910, Hardinge was raised to the peerage as Baron Hardinge of Penshurst, in the County of Kent, and appointed by the Asquith government as Viceroy of India.

His tenure was a memorable one and included the visit of King George V and the Delhi Durbar of 1911, as well as the move of the capital from Calcutta to New Delhi in 1911. Although Hardinge was the target of assassination attempts with bomb attack by the Indian nationalists Rashbehari Bose and Sachin Sanyal, his tenure included an improvement of relations between the British administration and the nationalists, as a consequence of the implementation of the Morley-Minto reforms of 1909, and of Hardinge's own admiration for Mohandas Gandhi and criticism of the South African government's anti-Indian immigration policies..  Hardinge founded the Dhamrai Hardinge High School and College in 1914. The Hardinge Railway Bridge, now in Bangladesh, was constructed and inaugurated (1915) in his tenure. It has continued to serve a crucial a role in the country's railway network. 

Hardinge's efforts paid off in 1914 during the First World War. Improved colonial relationships allowed Britain to deploy nearly all of the British troops in India as well as many native Indian troops to areas outside India. In particular, the British Indian Army played a significant (though initially mismanaged) role in the Mesopotamian campaign.

In 1916, Hardinge returned to his former post in England as Permanent Under-Secretary at the Foreign Office, serving with Arthur Balfour. In 1920, he became ambassador to France before his retirement in 1922.

Honours
As well as the distinction of being awarded six British knighthoods, he also gained foreign awards:
Knight of Grace of Order of St. John of Jerusalem in England. 
Grand officer in the Legion of Honour, from France.
Grand cross of the Crown of Italy.
Order of the Immaculate Conception of Vila Viçosa, from Portugal.
Order of the Redeemer, from Greece.
Order of Charles III, from Spain.
Order of St. Olav, from Norway.
Order of Alexander Nevsky, from Russia.
Order of the Dannebrog, from Denmark.
Order of Vasa, from Sweden.

Personal life

He married his first cousin Winifred Selina Sturt on 17 April 1890, over the objections of her family, due to the couple's consanguinity and Hardinge's financial status. She was the second daughter of Henry Gerard Sturt, first Baron Alington, by his first wife Lady Augusta Bingham, who was the first daughter of George Charles Bingham, third Earl of Lucan.  The couple had a daughter, Diamond Hardinge (1900-1927), and two sons, Edward and Alexander (1894–1960), who succeeded him as Baron Hardinge of Penshurst.

The first Baron Hardinge of Penshurst is commemorated at St John the Baptist, Penshurst. His eldest son, The Hon. Edward Hardinge, died 18 December 1914, aged 22, from wounds while serving as a Lieutenant with the 15th (The King's) Hussars in France. He was also the godson of Alexandra of Denmark. Diamond Hardinge was a bridesmaid at the wedding of Prince Albert, Duke of York, and Lady Elizabeth Bowes-Lyon on 3 May 1923.

Styles and honours
Hardinge had the unusual distinction of being a non-royal recipient of six British knighthoods.

June 1858 – July 1895: The Honourable Charles Hardinge
July 1895 – April 1903: The Honourable Charles Hardinge 
April 1903 – 7 March 1904: The Honourable Charles Hardinge 
7–26 March 1904: The Right Honourable Charles Hardinge 
26 March – 28 April 1904: The Right Honourable Sir Charles Hardinge 
28 April – 10 May 1904: His Excellency The Right Honourable Sir Charles Hardinge 
10 May 1904 – 2 January 1905: His Excellency The Right Honourable Sir Charles Hardinge 
2 January – 9 November 1905: His Excellency The Right Honourable Sir Charles Hardinge 
9 November 1905 – June 1906: The Right Honourable Sir Charles Hardinge 
June 1906 – 23 June 1910: The Right Honourable Sir Charles Hardinge 
23 June – 2 August 1910: The Right Honourable Sir Charles Hardinge 
2 August – 23 November 1910: The Right Honourable The Lord Hardinge of Penshurst 
23 November 1910 – 24 March 1916: His Excellency The Right Honourable The Lord Hardinge of Penshurst  Viceroy & Governor-General of India
24 March – 4 April 1916: His Excellency The Right Honourable The Lord Hardinge of Penshurst  Viceroy & Governor-General of India
4 April 1916 – 27 November 1920: The Right Honourable The Lord Hardinge of Penshurst 
27 November 1920 – 1 February 1923: His Excellency The Right Honourable the Lord Hardinge of Penshurst  HM Ambassador Extraordinary & Plenipotentiary to the French Republic
1 February 1923 – 2 August 1944: The Right Honourable The Lord Hardinge of Penshurst

Books written 
 Old Diplomacy
 My Indian Years covers (1910-16)

See also
Delhi conspiracy case

References

Sources

Articles

Further reading

 
 Hardinge Bridge

External links
 Hardinge of Penshurst, Baron (UK, 1910), genealogy
 
 
Hardinge's entry at Who's Who

Viceroys of India
1910s in British India
Members of HM Diplomatic Service
1858 births
1944 deaths
Alumni of Trinity College, Cambridge
Barons in the Peerage of the United Kingdom
Companions of the Imperial Service Order
Deputy Lieutenants of Kent
Diplomatic peers
Knights of the Garter
Knights Grand Cross of the Order of the Bath
Knights Grand Commander of the Order of the Star of India
Knights Grand Commander of the Order of the Indian Empire
Knights Grand Cross of the Order of St Michael and St George
Knights Grand Cross of the Royal Victorian Order
Younger sons of viscounts
Ambassadors of the United Kingdom to Russia
Ambassadors of the United Kingdom to France
Permanent Under-Secretaries of State for Foreign Affairs
People from Penshurst
Members of the Privy Council of the United Kingdom
Barons created by George V
19th-century British diplomats
20th-century British diplomats
People educated at Harrow School